Miró Quesada is a Hispanic surname of Balearic-Jewish origin. It can refer to the following people:

Francisco Miró Quesada Cantuarias (1918–2019), Peruvian philosopher
Luis Miró Quesada (1880–1976), Peruvian journalist and politician
Luis Miró Quesada Garland (1914–1994), Peruvian architect and professor
Óscar Miró Quesada de la Guerra (1884–1981), Peruvian scientific journalist

See also
Milo Quesada (born Raúl García Alonso; 1930–2012), Argentinian actor

Spanish-language surnames